Eric Sanders may refer to:

 Eric Sanders (American football player) (born 1958), guard and tackle in the National Football League
 Eric Sanders (American football coach), American football coach